Aris Dardamanis (born 20 November 1986) (Greek: Άρης Δαρδαμάνης) is a Greece international rugby league footballer who plays for the Aris Eagles.

Playing career
Aris start playing rugby league in 2013.
In 2022, Dardamanis was named in the Greece squad for the 2021 Rugby League World Cup, the first ever Greek Rugby League squad to compete in a World Cup.

References

External links
Greece profile
Greek profile

1986 births
Living people
Rugby league five-eighths
Rugby league halfbacks
Greek rugby league players
Greece national rugby league team players